Thompson station could refer to:

 Thompson station (LIRR), a former station in Brentwood, New York, United States
 Thompson station (Manitoba), a railway station in Thompson, Manitoba, Canada
 Thompson station (Utah), a former station in Thompson Springs, Utah, United States